Calamus compsostachys is a species of flowering plant in the family Arecaceae. It is found only in China (Guangdong, Guangxi). Its natural habitats are subtropical or tropical dry forests and subtropical or tropical moist lowland forests.

Calamus compsostachys is threatened by habitat loss.

References

compsostachys
Flora of China
Flora of Guangdong
Flora of Guangxi
Critically endangered plants
Plants described in 1937
Taxonomy articles created by Polbot
Taxa named by Max Burret